Clifton Forge station is a train station in Clifton Forge, Virginia, serving Amtrak's Cardinal line. It is located at 307 East Ridgeway Street.

History

The Virginia Central Railroad extended to Clifton Forge in 1857 here, a point originally called Jackson River. The railroad's first station building on the site was constructed in 1891. Passenger operations moved to the nearby Gladys Inn in 1897.

The modern two-story station building is a clapboard structure originally built by the Chesapeake and Ohio Railway (C&O) in 1906 as the railway's local offices. It became the passenger station in 1930 when the Gladys Inn was converted into the local YMCA building. It sits just east of a major locomotive fuel facility for CSX Transportation.

Plans

In 2013, Amtrak announced that it plans to move the stop to a new station built by the Chesapeake and Ohio Historical Society. The building is a replica of the original 1891 station, and it is located on Main Street, east of the current facility.

References

External links 

C&O Railway Heritage Center
Clifton Forge Amtrak Station (USA Rail Guide - Train Web)

Buildings and structures in Alleghany County, Virginia
Amtrak stations in Virginia
Stations along Chesapeake and Ohio Railway lines
Railway stations in the United States opened in 1891
Railway stations in the United States opened in 1906
Transportation in Alleghany County, Virginia